Carlo re d'Allemagna is a three-act dramma per musica by Italian composer Alessandro Scarlatti to a libretto by Giuseppe Papis, after , premiered at the Teatro San Bartolomeo of Naples on 26 or 30 January 1716. This is the composer's 79th opera out of 114 composed.

Papis adds comic roles (Amilla and Bleso) to Silvani's drama, a contrast much appreciated in Naples, absent from Silvani's original libretto, which play the role of intermezzi at the end of the acts.

The title refers to Charles the Bald and Judith of Bavaria.

Roles 
 Lotario, German Emperor, performed by Senesino at the premiere
 Giuditta, Empress Dowager, performed by Margherita Durastanti at the premiere
 Adalgiso, the son: Pietro Casati at the premiere
 Gildippe, the daughter: Agata Landi at the premiere
 Berardo, knight of the court
 Asprando, court traitor
 Amilla, Giuditta's maid
 Bleso, valet of Lotario

Synopsis 
Lotario plots against his half-brother Carlo and his mother-in-law Giuditta to gain access to the throne he covets.

Recordings 
 Carlo re d'Allemagna – Romina Basso, contralto (Lotario); Roberta Invernizzi, soprano (Giuditta); Marina de Liso, mezzo-soprano (Gildippe); Marianne Beate Kielland, mezzo-soprano (Adalgiso); Carlo Allemano, tenor (Berardo); Josè Maria Lo Monaco, mezzo-soprano (Asprando); Damiana Pinti, alto (Armilla); Roberto Abbondanza, bass (Bleso); Orchestre symphonique de Stavanger, conductor/violin Fabio Biondi (30 November – 4 December 2009, 3CD Agogique AGO015)  – The recording does not include eleven of the opera's 46 arias.

Sinfonia and arias
 "Del ciel sui giri" (Lotario), in Arias pour Senesino – Andreas Scholl; Accademia Bizantina, conductor Ottavio Dantone (25–26 and 28–30 June 2004, Decca Records 475 6569)
 "Sinfonia avanti l'opera"; "Quel cor ch'un regio serto"; "Il mio cor costante e fido" "Aure voi che susurrando", in Arie et sinfonie – Daniela Barcellona, contralto. Concerto de Cavalieri, dir. Marcello Di Lisa (23 to 24 August 2010, Deutsche Harmonia Mundi 88697842162)

See also 
 Lotario (1729), opera by Handel

References

External links 
 
 Carlo, Re d’Alemagna on ForumOpera
 Carlo re d'Allemagna on OperaBaroque.fr
 

Operas by Alessandro Scarlatti
1716 operas
Italian-language operas
Opera seria
Operas set in the 9th century
Operas set in Germany
Cultural depictions of French kings